Kunlun Energy Limited, formerly CNPC (Hong Kong) Limited, became a Hong Kong-listed company in 1993 through a backdoor listing. Its parent company is the China National Petroleum Corporation which itself was created from the transformation of the Ministry of Petroleum Industry in the People's Republic of China in 1988. It is engaged in the investment of exploration, development and production of crude oil and natural gas in China, Kazakhstan, Oman, Peru, Thailand, Azerbaijan and Indonesia.

See also
 Energy in Hong Kong

References

External links
Old website as CNPC (Hong Kong) Limited

Oil and gas companies of Hong Kong
Government-owned companies of China
Energy companies established in 1994
Non-renewable resource companies established in 1994
1994 establishments in Hong Kong
Chinese companies established in 1994
Companies listed on the Hong Kong Stock Exchange